This article contains a list of people who have served as mayor of Zagreb, the capital of Croatia, or president of the Zagreb Assembly.

List

See also
List of mayors in Croatia

References

External links

Grad Zagreb - svi gradonačelnici 

Zagreb

History of Zagreb
Mayors